The Battle of Chappar Chiri, also called Battle of Sirhind,
was fought between Mughal Empire and the Sikhs on 12 May 1710 at Chappar Chiri, located 20 kilometers from Sirhind

Background
The Sikhs were planning to crusade against the city of Sirhind, its governor Wazir Khan and dewan Sucha Nand, to avenge Mughal oppression and the execution of the two young children of Guru Gobind Singh. Some prominent towns on the way to Sirhind were captured and plundered including Sonepat, Kaithal, Samana, Shahabad, Mustafabad and Sadhaura by Baba Banda Singh Bahadur's troops as they could provide military assistance to the Mughal government of Sirhind. The number of plunderers also amassed, who were looking forward to prey upon the riches within the walls of Sirhind and followed Baba Banda Singh and his troops on the march to Sirhind. Both the troops of Baba Banda Singh and Wazir Khan faced each other at a village called Chappar Chiri.

Pre-Battle maneuvers

Before the battle began, Wazir Khan and Sucha Nand sent Sucha Nand's nephew with 1000 men to Baba Banda Singh Bahadur in a plot to deceive the Sikhs, by falsely claiming to have deserted the Mughals and have come joined the Sikhs for their cause. Wazir Khan had a large well-armed army, which included the Ghazis, along with a number of artillery, muskets, and elephants. Khan's army was larger than 20,000. On the other hand, Banda Singh's army was ill-equipped with long spears, arrows, swords, without artillery and elephants and insufficient amount of horses. According to Ganda Singh, Banda's army consisted of three classes of men where the first class were the devoted Sikhs imbued to crusade against the enemies of their country and religion, the second being the paid recruited soldiers sent by the chieftains of the Phul family, who sympathized with Banda Singh's cause. The third were the irregulars who were professional robbers and dacoits, eager to seize the opportunity to plunder the city. They were also the most unreliable allies as they would desert when fearing a sign of defeat. Hari Ram Gupta writes that Banda's army consisted of three groups, the first being Sikhs fighting purely to punish Wazir Khan, the second being Sikhs intent on plundering and punishing enemies of their faith. The third being Hindu Jats, Gujars and Rajputs intent on plunder alone.

The Battle

Upon the firing of artillery by the Mughal army, the third class of Banda's army, consisting of robbers and irregulars fled, and soon after Sucha Nand's nephew along with his 1000 men took to flight as well. To encourage his army, Banda Singh himself rushed into the battle, severely attacking the imperial army, leading to many Mughal soldiers being killed, including Sher Muhammad Khan and Khwaja Ali of Malerkotla. Wazir Khan was also killed which led to the defeat and retreat of his army to Sirhind, where many were killed during Banda's pursuit of them.

Aftermath
After the defeat of the Mughal army at the battle of Chappar Chiri, the siege of Sirhind took place where the Sikhs besieged, stormed, plundered and razed the city of Sirhind.

Popular culture
 A Punjabi animated film Chaar Sahibzaade: Rise of Banda Singh Bahadur which was released on 11 November 2016 depicts the battle of Chappar Chiri.
 Fateh Burj is the highest victory tower constructed in remembrance of this battle.

See also
 Fateh Burj, monument built in commemoration of this battle
 Battle of Sonipat
 Chappar Chiri

References

Chappar Chiri
Wars involving the states and peoples of Asia
Chappar Chiri
Chappar Chiri
1710 in Asia
Chappar Chiri